Wang Qing (born 10 March 1993 in Beijing) is a Chinese actor, singer and host. He was invited to play Chi Cheng in the web series Counterattack in May 2015 and entered into the public eye. On 22 September 2015, he collaborated with Feng Jianyu and released the song This Summer. He has become a regular host for Super Show on Anhui Television since April 2016. In July 2016, he played a lead role in the film Infinite Fight.

Life and career

Life 
Wang Qing was born in China. In 2012, he was admitted to Beijing Union University, initially majoring in acting. Later in his junior year, he transferred to broadcasting and hosting, and eventually graduated in 2016. During his school life, he once opened a diner called Malatang From The Stars. In 2015, his cousin approached him about acting in a web series.

Career

Film 
Wang Qing began his career playing the role of Chi Cheng in the web series Counterattack, opposite his lover and classmate Feng Jianyu, that was released in August 2015. In September 2015, he joined the shooting of Counterattack special episode, which was released on September 16. Through the web series, he won the "Most Popular Web Series Actor" title awarded by Weibo Video Station. In July 2016, he co-starred in a web movie Infinite Fight with Feng Jianyu. The movie was nominated for seven awards in the World Chinese Science Fiction Movies Nebula Awards.

Music 
On 22 September 2015, Wang Qing collaborated with Feng Jianyu and released the song This Summer. This Summer ranked No.1 on the Fresh Asia Weekly Chart for four consecutive weeks and also ranked first on the October monthly chart. This Summer also set a record of 460,000 digital copies sold on Sina Weibo. He co-starred with Feng Jianyu in the music video and short film of This Summer. This Summer music video ranked No.4 in YinYueTai 2015 Mainland TOP 100. Wang Qing held three fan meetings for This Summer with Feng Jianyu, in Tianjin, Chengdu and Shenzhen. This Summer won the "Most Popular Collaboration" in the 16th Top Chinese Music Annual Festival.

In March 2016, Wang Qing released his first single, DEMO. DEMO ranked No.1 on the Fresh Asia
Chart for four consecutive weeks and ranked first on its March monthly chart.

In December 2016, Wang Qing released his first album "December". The first limited edition 5000 copies were sold out in seconds. The album got Platinum record sale.

Stage 
In April 2016, Wang Qing played Zhang Yang in The Left Ear stage play at Beijing Bao Li Theater. It was his first stage work.

Host 
In March 2016, Wang Qing co-hosted the 2nd KU Music Asian Music Awards red carpet show with Feng Jianyu.
Since March 2017, he is one of the hosts of IQIYI foodie travel show "Eat the Whole Universe" (吃光全宇宙 ).

Discography

Singles

Album

Filmography

Web

Host

Stage

Awards and nominations

References

External links 
 

1993 births
Male actors from Beijing
Singers from Beijing
Living people
21st-century Chinese male actors
Chinese male television actors
Chinese male film actors
Chinese Mandopop singers
21st-century Chinese male singers